William John Brown (17 June 1906 – 20 April 1981) was an Australian rules footballer who played for the Hawthorn Football Club in the Victorian Football League (VFL).

Family
The son of William James Brown (1875–1925) and Charlotte Brown, nee Edwards (1875–1965), William John Brown was born in Newport, Victoria on 17 June 1906

Football
Brown joined Hawthorn from Altona in 1926 and played a total of 12 senior games over his three seasons at the club.

He was granted a clearance to Yarraville in the Victoria Football Association in July 1928 but did not receive a permit to play until 1929 and he played with Yarraville until 1931.

Death
William Brown died at Brunswick on 20 April 1981 and was cremated at Altona Memorial Cemetery.

Notes

External links 

Bill Brown's playing statistics from The VFA Project

1906 births
1981 deaths
Australian rules footballers from Victoria (Australia)
Hawthorn Football Club players
Yarraville Football Club players
People from Newport, Victoria